"Novo" is a song by Italian singer Laura Pausini featuring the Brazilian duo Simone & Simaria, making part of the album Fatti sentire by Laura. It is the second official single of the disc, released especially in the Brazilian market.

Background 
Rumors that Simone & Simaria would record a song with Laura Pausini appeared in 2017 when, in an interview, it was mentioned that they received a call from an executive of Warner Music, an Italian record label, proposing the duet. A bigger clue was revealed when streaming platforms like Deezer and Spotify revealed that the album would have a special version for Brazil containing the duet.

The lyrics were written by Laura Pausini and Yoel Henriquez, and the song was composed by Danijel Vuletic. The adaptation for the Portuguese is authored by the singer herself. This is a fact unheard of in the career of the Italian, who in all her songs in Portuguese has had the help of friends or external composers in translations. Despite being mostly sung in Portuguese, there are a few Spanish-language excerpts being sung during the chorus.

This is Pausini's third partnership with a Brazilian artist. In 2001, the song Seamisai (Sei que me amavas) had the participation of Gilberto Gil. In 2013, she dueted with Ivete Sangalo in Le cose che vivi / Tudo o que eu vivo.

Music video 
The music video was directed by João Monteiro and Fernando Moraes, and shot in February 2018 in Brazil. It was made available on March 30, 2018, through the YouTube channel of Warner Music Italy.

Spanish version 

"Nuevo" is a song by Italian singer Laura Pausini, making part of the album Fatti sentire by Laura. It is the Spanish version of the single "Novo", but released especially in the international market.

Track listing

Charts
Spanish-language version

References 

Laura Pausini songs
2018 songs
Brazilian songs
Songs written by Laura Pausini
Songs written by Yoel Henriquez